Kloß (ß is a double s) may  refer to:

 Kloß, the German word for dumpling, also known by the regional term Knödel
 Kloss, a German surname